"Break My Heart" is a song by American rapper Rod Wave, released on November 10, 2022, as the lead single from his debut EP Jupiter's Diary: 7 Day Theory (2022). It contains a sample of "Love Me More" by Sam Smith and was produced by TnTXD, TrillGotJuice and Colorado.

Music video
The music video was released alongside the single. In it, Rod Wave spends quality time with his children, with beautiful, vibrant scenery of a body of water behind him, and cleans his collection of jewelry as well.

Charts

References

2022 singles
2022 songs
Rod Wave songs
Songs written by Rod Wave
Songs written by Sam Smith (singer)
Songs written by Mikkel Storleer Eriksen
Songs written by Tor Erik Hermansen
Songs written by Jimmy Napes